Pinrang Regency is one of the twenty-one regencies in South Sulawesi Province of Indonesia. Pinrang town is the administrative capital of Pinrang Regency. The regency covers 1,961.77 km2 and had a population of 351,161 at the 2010 Census and 403,994 at the 2020 Census; the official estimate as at mid 2021 was 407,371.

Administrative districts 
Pinrang Regency in 2020 comprised twelve administrative Districts (Kecamatan), tabulated below with their areas and their populations at the 2010 Census and the 2020 Census, together with the official estimates as at mid 2021. The table also includes the location of the district administrative centres, the number of administrative villages in each district (totalling 69 rural desa and 40 urban kelurahan), and its post code.

Notes: (a) including the offshore islands of Pulau Dapo, Pulau Kamerrang and Pulau Lawakkoang.

Climate
Pinrang has a tropical rainforest climate (Af) with moderate to heavy rainfall year-round. The following climate data is for the town of Pinrang.

References

External links 

 

Regencies of South Sulawesi